Ōrākei is a suburb in Auckland, New Zealand.

Ōrākei or Orakei may also refer to:

 Ngāti Whātua-o-Ōrākei or Ngāti Whātua Ōrākei, a Māori tribal group
 Ōrākei Basin, a volcano in the Auckland Volcanic Field
 Ōrākei (local board area), an Auckland local board area
 Ōrākei Local Board, an Auckland local board
 Ōrākei Ward, an Auckland Council ward
 Ōrākei railway station, an Auckland railway station

See also

 Orakei Korako, a geothermal area in the Taupo Volcanic Area